Hyundai Global Business Center (Korean: 현대차 글로벌 비즈니스 센터) is a proposed building in Samseong-dong, Gangnam District, Seoul with a planned height of  and planned floor count of 105. If completed, it will be a supertall skyscraper.

In January 2021, the project was reported to be cancelled or undergoing redesign.

History
Initial work on the site began in 2016 with the demolition of the existing KEPCO building in May 2016. 

The Hyundai Motor Group had previously planned to construct a 553-meter-tall building, but had to revise it to 569 meters due to some systemic issues.

The building complex will stand on a floor space of 926,162 meters to house the new headquarters building with 105 floors on a 560,443-square-meter space. The building will also host a 155,082-square-meter hotel and facility building with 35 floors, 67,768-square-meter concert hall with 9 floors, 68,895-square-meter convention center with 6 floors and 20,006-square-meter exhibition hall with 4 floors, according to the draft. An observatory will be located on 553 meters above the ground as originally planned. The concert hall with 2,000 seats will become the largest one in Gangnam. The Hyundai Motor Group will also build a sunken square connecting the complex to the underground of Yeongdong Bridge, public open space and public pedestrian passage, the group said in the draft.

See also
 List of buildings with 100 floors or more
 List of tallest buildings in Seoul
 List of tallest buildings in South Korea

References

Hyundai Motor Group
Buildings and structures under construction in South Korea
Skyscraper office buildings in Seoul
Buildings and structures in Gangnam District